Hudson Lima Silva (born 8 May 1984) is a Brazilian football player.

Career 
Hudson played previously with CF Rio de Janeiro, Associação Atlética Portuguesa Santista, Três Passos Atlético Clube, União Central Futebol Clube, Paysandu Sport Club, América Mineiro in Brazil and Indian side Mohun Bagan.

Notes 

1984 births
Brazilian footballers
Brazilian expatriate footballers
Expatriate footballers in India
Brazilian expatriate sportspeople in India
Mohun Bagan AC players
Association football midfielders
Paysandu Sport Club players
Sportspeople from Pernambuco
Associação Atlética Portuguesa (Santos) players
Living people
Association football forwards